John G. Myers Company was a department store in Albany, New York built in 1887 and owned by John Gillespy Myers. The building where the store was located, a five-story structure at 39 N. Pearl St., collapsed on August 8, 1905 killing 13 people. The collapse was the worst disaster of its kind in Albany's history at the time. Charges of manslaughter and criminal negligence were made against the building's contractor, John Dyer Jr., and architect, Clark L. Daggett, but a grand jury failed to convict them and the charges were dropped.

After the collapse the store reopened at 37 N. Pearl St. and stayed in business until 1970.

References

Defunct department stores based in New York State
1905 disasters in the United States
1905 in New York (state)
Building collapses in the United States
Disasters in New York (state)
History of Albany, New York